Accord Pond (pronounced Ah-cord with a long A) is a  reservoir in Hingham, Norwell and Rockland, Massachusetts. The reservoir is located off Route 228 at its terminus with Route 3. The reservoir is visible from Route 3 northbound at Exit 14, the Route 228 off-ramp. The reservoir is a Class A source of water supply for the town of Hingham and Hull Ma. The outflow of the reservoir is Accord Brook, a tributary of the Weir River. Accord, a village in Hingham on the Hingham/Norwell town line, lies on the northeastern shore of the reservoir along Route 53.

External links
Environmental Protection Agency

Reservoirs in Massachusetts
Lakes of Plymouth County, Massachusetts
Buildings and structures in Plymouth County, Massachusetts
Hingham, Massachusetts
Norwell, Massachusetts
Rockland, Massachusetts